Norman Speirs (31 May 1886 – 1 August 1960) was an Australian cricketer. He played two first-class cricket matches for Victoria in 1908.

See also
 List of Victoria first-class cricketers

References

External links
 

1886 births
1960 deaths
Australian cricketers
Victoria cricketers
Cricketers from Melbourne